The Women's 4 × 100 metre medley relay competition of the 2022 European Aquatics Championships was held on 17 August 2022.

Records
Prior to the competition, the existing European and championship records were as follows.

Results

Heats
The heats were started at 09:57.

Final
The final was held at 19:16.

References

Women's 4 x 100 metre medley relay
European